Ficus pandurata is a fig species in the family Moraceae.  No subspecies are recorded and the native range of this species is southern China and Indo-China.  The species can be found in Vietnam: where it may be called sung tì bà.

References

External links

pandurata
Trees of Vietnam
Flora of Indo-China